Snina District (okres Snina) is a district in
the Prešov Region of eastern Slovakia. 
Until 1918, the district was part of the county of Kingdom of Hungary of Zemplín.

Municipalities

Belá nad Cirochou
Brezovec
Čukalovce
Dlhé nad Cirochou
Dúbrava
Hostovice
Hrabová Roztoka
Jalová
Kalná Roztoka
Klenová
Kolbasov
Kolonica
Ladomirov
Michajlov
Nová Sedlica
Osadné
Parihuzovce
Pčoliné
Pichne
Príslop
Runina
Ruská Volová
Ruský Potok
Snina
Stakčín
Stakčianska Roztoka
Strihovce
Šmigovec
Topoľa
Ubľa
Ulič
Uličské Krivé
Zboj
Zemplínske Hámre

References 

Districts of Slovakia
Geography of Prešov Region